Narasingapuram is a village in the Tiruvallur district of Tamil Nadu, India. It is located in the Gummidipoondi taluk. Elavur is the closest railway station.

Demographics 

According to the 2011 census of India, Narasingapuram has 264 households. The effective literacy rate (i.e. the literacy rate of population excluding children aged 6 and below) is 63.39%.

References 

Villages in Gummidipoondi taluk